The National Association of Telecommunications Officers and Advisors (NATOA) is a US-based professional membership association that provides support to members on the many local, state, and federal communications laws, administrative rulings, judicial decisions, and technology issues impacting the interests of local governments. Founded in 1980, NATOA offers a wide range of advocacy services to individual and agency members representing cities, towns, counties and commissions across the country.  NATOA has a headquarters office in Alexandria, VA, and is served by a twelve-member volunteer board of directors composed of members from across the country.

Leadership 
The National Association of Telecommunication Officers and Advisors is overseen by a board of directors that
consists of eleven voting Directors (one President, one President-Elect and nine Directors) and one non-voting
Director (the Immediate Past President) all of whom must maintain status as a voting member of the
association throughout the duration of their terms.
The Board of Directors shall have the authority to appoint, at its option, an Executive Committee which is
composed of the President, President-elect, and Secretary-Treasurer.

The current President of NATOA is Michael J. Russo, Communications Director, City of Calabasas, CA.

Past Presidents of NATOA:
2019 - 2021 - Brian Roberts, San Francisco, CA
2017 - 2019 - Mike Lynch, Boston MA
2015 - 2017 - Jodie Miller, Inver Grove Heights, MN
2013 - 2015 - Tony Perez, Seattle, WA
2011 - 2013 - Joanne Hovis
2009 - 2011 - Ken Fellman, Arvada, CO
2007 - 2009 - Mary Beth Henry, Portland, OR
2006 - 2007 - Paul Berra, St. Louis, MO
2005 - 2006 - Doris Boris, Charlotte, NC
2004 - 2005 - Lori Panzino-Tillery, San Bernardino County, CA
2003 - 2004 - Coralie Wilson - Roseville, MN
2001 - 2003 - Denise Brady - San Francisco, CA
2000 - 2001 - Ron Mallard - Fairfax County, VA
1999 - 2000 - Darryl Anderson - Washington DC
1998 - 1999 - Jane Lawton - Montgomery County, MD
1997 - 1998 - Tom Weisner - Aurora, IL
1996 - 1997 - Byron West - Denver, CO
1995 - 1996 - Mike Reardon - St. Paul, MN
1994 - 1995 - Susan Littlefield - St. Louis, MO
1993 - 1994 - Bill Squadron - New York City, NY
1992 - 1993 - David Olson - Portland, OR
1990 - 1992 - Susan Herman - Santa Monica, CA
1988 - 1990 - Paul Berra - St. Louis, MO
1987 - 1988 - Donna Mason - Vancouver, WA
1985 - 1987 - Bill Bradley - Denver, CO
1983 - 1985 - John Hansman - Rockville, MD
1980 - 1983 - Frank Greif - Seattle, WA

Advocacy 

NATOA is highly respected and regarded by members of Congress and the FCC as a major voice and key advisor
regarding local government perspectives and the public interest. We continuously collaborate with key legislators
and FCC commissioners and staff to ensure NATOA's voice is heard and our positions are considered. As a trade
organization, NATOA facilitates our ability to pool resources in order to make an impact in a world where the
industry is able to spend exponentially more than local governments will ever be able to afford. In addition to
utilizing the talent of its members, NATOA cooperates with colleague organizations such as National League of
Cities (NLC), United States Conference of Mayors (USCM), National Association of Counties (NACo), and Alliance
for Community Media (ACM).

History 
Originally named the Association of Cable Regulators, NATOA formed in 1980 as an affiliated association with the National League of Cities (NLC), before eventually became an independent association shortly thereafter.  NATOA's knowledge and understanding of how federal communications policies impact local governments and the citizens we represent have resulted in our ability to have direct influence on legislation, regulations, and policy development.

Membership & Chapters 
NATOA represents local governments across the country. Members include cities, counties, towns, villages and commissions. NATOA also has regional chapters that are affiliated with the national NATOA organization. Chapters include:

CAPATOA – National Capital Association of Telecommunications Officers & Advisors
CCUA – Colorado Communications and Utility Alliance
HITOA - Hawaii
ILNATOA - Illinois
JAG - Jersey Access Group
KATOA - Kentucky
MI-NATOA - Michigan
MACTA - Minnesota
OATOA - Oregon
SCAN-NATOA - States of California & Nevada
TATOA - Texas
VATOA - Virginia
WATOA - Washington

Activities 
NATOA hosts an Annual Conference each year, providing members the opportunity to gather and learn from the best in the field. The conference features an exhibit tradeshow, educational workshops, networking opportunities, roundtable discussions, and presentation of the winners of the Government Programming Awards (GPAs) and the Community Broadband & Digital Equity Awards.

The Government Programming Awards (GPAs) are annual awards that recognize excellence in broadcast, cable, multimedia and electronic programming produced by local government agencies. Categories cover a variety of programming including, among others, community events, documentary, public affairs and public service, interview/talk show, performing arts, sports, election coverage and children’ s issues. Celebrating over 30 years of programming excellence, the GPA's celebrate the achievements of government programmers across the nation.

Launched in 2007, the Community Broadband & Digital Equity Awards recognize exceptional leaders in government, business and the community are serving as champions of local interests and needs in broadband and technology. Winners are announced annually and recognized during the Annual Conference.

NATOA offers additional educational opportunities through its eNATOA series, low-cost monthly webinars on various topics of interest to members.

NATOA also publishes an electronic newsletter eN-Light, and hosts list serve forums offering membership the opportunity to easily communicate with fellow members across the country.

See also
 Cable television in the United States
 Public-access television
 Educational-access television
 Government-access television
 List of public-access TV stations in the United States

References

External links
 Official web site. NATOA Website

Cable television in the United States
Trade associations based in the United States